Minority Report may refer to:

 Minority report (Poor Law), published by the UK Royal Commission on the Poor Laws and Relief of Distress 1905–09
 "Minority Report", a 1949 science fiction short story by Theodore Sturgeon
 "The Minority Report", a 1956 science fiction short story by Philip K. Dick
 The Minority Report (1991 collection), a 1991 collection of stories by Philip K. Dick
 Minority Report (2002 collection), a 2002 collection of stories by Philip K. Dick
 Minority Report (film), a 2002 film loosely adapted from Dick's short story
 Minority Report (TV series), a 2015 American television series on FOX that serves as a sequel adaptation of the novel and 2002 film
 Minority Report: Everybody Runs, a video game based on the film
 Minority Report, a 1956 book by H. L. Mencken
 "Minority Report", a 2006 single by Jay-Z from the album Kingdom Come
 The Minority Report with Larry Wilmore, the working title of the Comedy Central late night talk show The Nightly Show with Larry Wilmore